Notovolutini is a tribe of sea snails, a marine gastropod mollusks in the family Volutidae.

References

External links
 Worms Link

 
Protostome tribes